Valencian People's Initiative (Valencian: Iniciativa del Poble Valencià, IdPV) is a Valencianist and ecosocialist political party, in the Valencian Country, Spain.  IdPV is a part of the Compromís coalition.

Ideology 
According to one of its leaders, Pasqual Mollà, IdPV is an "ecosocialist and Valencianist" party. According to the documents of its founding congress, IdPV is "a political alternative to the left of classical social democracy". IdPV has received a lot of support from Initiative for Catalonia Greens, a very similar party that exists in Catalonia.

History 
 
IdPV was founded after Esquerra i país (Left and Country), an internal current of United Left of the Valencian Country (EUPV), created a new political party. IdPV left EUPV in 2008.

References

Notes

External links

 Official website of Coalició Compromís (in Valencian)

Political parties in the Valencian Community
Regionalist parties in Spain
Secessionist organizations in Europe
Green political parties in Spain
Socialist parties in Spain
Valencian nationalism
Left-wing nationalist parties